José Ernesto Sosa (born 19 June 1985) is an Argentine professional footballer who plays as a midfielder for Argentina Primera Division club Estudiantes de La Plata.

Club career

Estudiantes

Sosa played for Estudiantes between 2002 and 2007. He was a favorite of interim coach Carlos Bilardo, and together with Marcelo Carrusca started helping the team improve their standing in the Argentine league. The highlight of his tenure with Estudiantes was being a key piece in the 7–0 defeat of derby rivals Gimnasia on 15 October 2006, and then his role in helping the team win their first league title since 1983 by scoring the equalizing goal from a free kick against Boca Juniors in the 2006 Apertura final playoff game.

Bayern Munich
On 24 February 2007, a deal was announced between Estudiantes and Bayern Munich, in which Sosa would be transferred to Bayern Munich for an undisclosed fee. Sosa stayed with Estudiantes for the remainder of the Clausura 2007 tournament.

On 29 October 2009, Bayern Munich announced that the Argentine midfielder will be loaned to his former club Estudiantes for the remainder of the season, even though he was not registered to play the 2009 World Club Championship finals.

Napoli
On 30 August 2010, Sosa joined Italian side Napoli for €2 million fee (including €100,000 solidarity contribution to youth clubs of Sosa), signing a four-year deal.

Metalist Kharkiv
On 26 July 2011, it was announced that Jose Sosa had joined the Ukrainian team Metalist Kharkiv for €1.9 million. For his tenure with Metalist, Sosa adopted the number 11 jersey honoring his admired ex-teammate Juan Sebastián Verón, and has been instrumental in the team's successful Europa League campaign. On 28 June 2012, Sosa was named as the new captain of FC Metalist Kharkiv.

On 1 January 2014, it was announced that he will join Atlético Madrid on six-month loan. With the Spaniards, he won the Spanish Liga and played in the 2014 UEFA Champions League Final against Real Madrid, coming on as a substitute, as Atlético lost 4–1 after extra time.

Beşiktaş
On 31 August 2014, Sosa was signed by Turkish club Beşiktaş on loan from Metalist Kharkiv. On 15 October 2014, the club announced that the buying option has been used, making Sosa's move to the Turkish side definitive, for €3.4 million. In the 2015–16 season, Sosa served 12 assists in 2015–16 Süper Lig, at least 4 more than any other player.

Milan
On 17 August 2016, Sosa joined Italian club A.C. Milan for €7.5 million fee, signing a two-year deal. He made his debut for Milan on 27 August 2016, coming off the bench in the 80th minute during a 4–2 loss away against his former club Napoli.

Following Riccardo Montolivo's long-term injury sustained in October 2016, Sosa assumed the role of a deep-lying playmaker, alternatively known as regista, operating in front of the team's defense line in 4–3–3 formation. Adapting to the change of position from his usual attacking midfielder role, he cited Juan Sebastián Verón as inspiration.

Trabzonspor
On 8 September 2017, Sosa moved back to Turkey, joining Süper Lig club Trabzonspor on loan with an option to make the deal permanent until 2020. On 15 January 2018, Trabzonspor exercised the option and paid a €3.4 million fee to Milan.

Fenerbahçe	
On 22 August 2020, Sosa signed a two-year contract with another Süper Lig club, Fenerbahçe. He made his debut for Fenerbahçe on 11 September 2020, coming off the bench in the 77th minute against Çaykur Rizespor, and scored from the penalty spot in 87th minute.

Return To Estudiantes de La Plata 
On 9 August 2022, Sosa returned to his youth club Estudiantes de la Plata to play for a 3rd time, signing a contract binding him to the club until June 2024.

International career
Sosa played for Argentina Under-20 team during the 2003 FIFA World Youth Championship.

National coach Alfio Basile drafted Sosa for the senior national team on 28 February 2007. Sosa said to the press that he will "never forget this Tuesday" in which he achieved two of his childhood dreams (the transfer to a major European club and the call to the national team).

He made his debut as a substitute at a friendly match against Mexico on 9 March 2007. He started his first match against Chile, on 18 April 2007. His first goal with the Albiceleste arrived on 23 January 2010, in a 3–2 win in a friendly match against Costa Rica, scoring the opening goal of the game with a header on 10 minutes.

Sosa was not called to the World Cup 2010 team by then-manager Diego Maradona, but was reinstated by new coach Alejandro Sabella for the World Cup 2014 qualifiers, and has been featured in several games since 2011.

Career statistics

Club
.

International

International goals

|-
|align=center|1||26 January 2010||San Juan, Argentina||||align=center|1–0||align=center|3–2||Friendly
|}

Honours

Club
Estudiantes de La Plata
Argentine Primera División: Apertura 2006

Bayern Munich
Bundesliga: 2007–08
DFB-Pokal: 2007–08
DFL-Ligapokal: 2007
DFL-Supercup: 2010

Atlético Madrid
La Liga: 2013–14

Beşiktaş
Süper Lig: 2015–16

Milan
Supercoppa Italiana: 2016

Trabzonspor
Turkish Cup: 2019–20

International
Argentina
 Summer Olympics Gold Medal: 2008

Individual 
 Süper Lig top assists: 2015–16 (12 assists)

References

External links

 Argentine Primera statistics at Fútbol XXI 
 
 
 

1985 births
Living people
Argentine footballers
Argentina international footballers
Argentina under-20 international footballers
Argentine expatriate footballers
Association football wingers
Argentine Primera División players
Bundesliga players
Serie A players
Ukrainian Premier League players
La Liga players
Süper Lig players
Estudiantes de La Plata footballers
FC Bayern Munich footballers
S.S.C. Napoli players
FC Metalist Kharkiv players
Atlético Madrid footballers
Beşiktaş J.K. footballers
A.C. Milan players
Trabzonspor footballers
Fenerbahçe S.K. footballers
Expatriate footballers in Germany
Expatriate footballers in Italy
Expatriate footballers in Ukraine
Expatriate footballers in Spain
Expatriate footballers in Turkey
Footballers at the 2008 Summer Olympics
Olympic footballers of Argentina
Olympic gold medalists for Argentina
Olympic medalists in football
Medalists at the 2008 Summer Olympics
Argentine expatriate sportspeople in Germany
Argentine expatriate sportspeople in Italy
Argentine expatriate sportspeople in Spain
Argentine expatriate sportspeople in Ukraine
Argentine expatriate sportspeople in Turkey
People from San Lorenzo Department
Sportspeople from Santa Fe Province